Soldier in the Rain is a 1963 American comedy buddy film directed by Ralph Nelson and starring Jackie Gleason and Steve McQueen. Tuesday Weld portrays Gleason's character's romantic partner.

Produced by Martin Jurow and co-written by Maurice Richlin and Blake Edwards, the screenplay is based upon a 1960 novel of the same name by William Goldman. It was directed by explores the friendship between an Army master sergeant (Gleason) and a young country bumpkin buck sergeant (McQueen). The music is by Henry Mancini.

The film was released five days after President John F. Kennedy's assassination. The national crisis reduced audiences for the film.

Plot
Sergeant Eustis Clay (Steve McQueen) cannot wait to finish his peacetime service and move on to bigger, better things. He is a personal favorite of Master Sergeant Maxwell Slaughter (Jackie Gleason), a career soldier who is considerably brighter than Eustis, but enjoys his company and loyalty. Slaughter is wired into all the perks, back channels, and supply sources an army base can provide, which filter through his nearly autonomous cabin hub.

Clay becomes involved in a number of schemes and scams, including one in which he will sell tickets for soldiers to watch private Meltzer (Tony Bill) purportedly run a three-minute mile. He inconveniences Slaughter more than once, and in one case has a traffic mishap that requires him being bailed out of jail.

Determined to tempt Slaughter with the joys of civilian life before his hitch is up, Clay fixes him up on a date with the much younger woman, not-too-bright Bobby Jo Pepperdine (Tuesday Weld). At first, Slaughter is offended, but gradually he sees another side of Bobby Jo, finding that they have a mutual fondness for crossword puzzles. Clay and Slaughter golf together and begin to enjoy the good life.

One night, Clay is devastated to learn of the death of his dog Donald. A pair of hated rivals use their status as military policemen to lure Clay into a barroom brawl, where he is being beaten two-against-one before Slaughter angrily comes to his rescue. Together, they win the fight, but the middle-aged, overweight Slaughter collapses from the effort.

Hospitalized, Slaughter delights Clay by suggesting that they leave the Army together and go live on a tropical isle, surrounded by blue seas and beautiful girls. But Slaughter dies. A changed man, Clay re-enlists in the Army with a new sense of purpose.

Cast
 Jackie Gleason as Master Sergeant Maxwell Slaughter
 Steve McQueen as Sergeant Eustis Clay
 Tuesday Weld as Bobby Jo Pepperdine
 Tony Bill as Private First Class Jerry Meltzer
 Tom Poston as Lieutenant Magee
 Ed Nelson as MP Sergeant First Class James Priest
 Lew Gallo as Sergeant Fred Lenahan
 Rockne Tarkington as First Sergeant William Booth
 Paul Hartman as Chief of Police
 John Hubbard as Battalion Major
 Chris Noel as Frances McCoy
 Sam Flint as Old Man
 Lewis Charles as Sergeant Tozzi
 Adam West as Inspecting Captain

Reception
In 2011, film critic Craig Butler wrote about the film's theme,

Source Novel

William Goldman drew his novel from his experience of being in the United States Army from 1952 to 1954. He set it at a fictional "Southern" Army post, Camp Scott, in the spring and summer of 1953. He says he was stuck during the writing. He asked his roommate John Kander, also an aspiring writer, to read it. Kander suggested that the woman (eventually played by Weld) should be developed as a major figure. This suggestion helped Goldman finish the rest of the book.

Goldman says the publisher put pressure on him to change the ending:
It was one of the first three books of the firm, and they said "We can't publish this ending. It's a downer. We guarantee you the book won't sell. Will you change it? I said, "I will absolutely change it, and I will give it a very happy ending, if you can guarantee me the book will sell." They said, "Obviously, we can't guarantee that," and I said, "Obviously, I can't change the ending."

Goldman says the character of Clay "was sympathetic for me. There was a sergeant who was a villain, but I thought Clay was just a nice affable stoop. I'd been in the army. A lot of this stuff is also, as I look back on it, autobiographical."

The novel received mixed reviews.

Although Goldman became a noted screenwriter, he was not involved in the adaptation of his novel for the film of the same name.

"They made changes", said Goldman of the film. "No one says 'Oh, we are going to fuck up Bill Goldman's book.' Most of this stuff I didn't pay any attention to. I don't know that I've ever seen Soldier in the Rain. I must have because I like Tuesday Weld but as a rule I don't look at movies I'm involved with and I don't read books that I've written. One does the best one can and that's it."

See also
 List of American films of 1963

References

 Andersen, Richard, William Goldman, Twayne Publishers, 1979
 Egan, Sean, William Goldman: The Reluctant Storyteller, Bear Manor Media, 2014

External links
 
 
 
 
 

1963 films
1963 comedy-drama films
1960s American films
1960s buddy comedy films
1960s English-language films
Allied Artists films
American black-and-white films
American buddy comedy-drama films
Films about the United States Army
Films based on American novels
Films based on works by William Goldman
Films directed by Ralph Nelson
Films scored by Henry Mancini
Military humor in film
Novels by William Goldman